Běchovice is a suburb of Prague, currently a municipal district in the administrative district Prague 21. It is located about 13 km east of the city centre. The main road and railway line connecting Prague and Kolín pass through Běchovice. The population as of 2008 was 4,038.

First mentioned in 1228 in possession of St. George's Convent at Prague Castle, the village was incorporated into Prague in 1974.

Běchovice railway station was the site of Massacre in Běchovice which happened on 17 June 1848.

Today the location is domestically known mainly for a mass attended 10 km run whose course follows the road from Běchovice towards Prague. It has been held in early autumn each year without interruption since 1897.

References

External links 
 http://www.praha-bechovice.cz/ official website of the municipal district
 http://www.bechovice-praha.cz/ official website of Běchovice - Prague Run
 https://www.facebook.com/PrahaBechovice Facebook of Běchovice in Prague

Districts of Prague